Kordon may refer to:

Geographic locations 
 Kordon, İzmir, a street and promenade in the Alsancak quarter of İzmir, Turkey
 Kordon, Poland, a village in Gmina Narewka of Hajnówka County of Podlaskie Voivodeship, Poland
 Kordon, Russia, several rural localities in Russia

People 
 Andrian Kordon (born 1977), Israeli judoka

Other uses
 The Cordon (Serbo-Croatian: Kordon), a 2002 Serbian film

See also 
 Cordon (disambiguation)